Pistacia saportae is a species of tree in the family Anacardiaceae.

Sources

References 

saportae
Flora of Malta